Mirage 27 may refer to either of two boat designs produced by Mirage Yachts under the same name:

Mirage 27 (Perry)
Mirage 27 (Schmidt)